is a private junior college in Takikawa, Hokkaido, Japan. It was first established as a junior women's college in 1982. In 1991 it became coeducational, adopting the present name at the same time.

External links
 Official website 

Educational institutions established in 1982
Private universities and colleges in Japan
Universities and colleges in Hokkaido
Japanese junior colleges
1982 establishments in Japan